Art Grant or art grant may refer to:
 Art Grant, Canadian ice hockey player
 Art Grant, American hockey player
 A grant given to artists